Djibril Coulibaly (born 11 August 1987) is a Malian professional footballer who plays as a forward for CO de Bamako.

Career 
In his early career, he played for Real Bamako, Al-Ahli, Fakel Chervonograd and Jeanne D'Arc.

Barito Putra 
In November 2012, he was signed with Brito Putra where he dominated the Indonesia league with his great goals scoring ability winning the league top scorer.

Persib Bandung 
In November 2013, he was signed with Persib. He was part of the team that won the 2014 Indonesia Super League. He was released on November 10, 2014.

Persija Jakarta 
In September 2016, he was signed with Persija Jakarta. He is expected to join Persija Jakarta until this season finish.

CO de Bamako 
In 2017. Coulibaly, joined to malian football club CO de Bamako.

Honors 
Persib Bandung
 Indonesia Super League: 2014

Individual 
 Best Foreign Striker Indonesia Super League

Personal life 
Coulibaly is Muslim who observes the Islamic month of Ramadan.

References

External links 
 

1986 births
Living people
Sportspeople from Bamako
Malian Muslims
Malian footballers
AS Real Bamako players
Malian expatriate footballers
Malian expatriate sportspeople in Saudi Arabia
Expatriate footballers in Saudi Arabia
Al-Ahli Saudi FC players
Malian expatriate sportspeople in Indonesia
Expatriate footballers in Indonesia
Liga 1 (Indonesia) players
PS Barito Putera players
Persib Bandung players
Association football forwards
Indonesian Super League-winning players
CO de Bamako players
21st-century Malian people